Walter Otheman Snelling (December 13, 1880September 10, 1965) was a chemist who contributed to the development of  explosives, ordnance, and liquefied petroleum gas.

Early life and career
Walter Otheman Snelling was born in Washington, D.C. on December 13, 1880, the elder of two sons of Walter Comonfort Snelling (1859-1893) and Alice Lee Hornor (1861-1919). Walter Comonfort Snelling was an inventor who patented an adding machine.  Alice Lee Hornor, from an old Quaker family, became a suffragette who studied law and medicine and traveled and wrote extensively. On June 27, 1894, she remarried, to John Oliver Moque. In addition to his full brother, Henry Hornor Snelling, Walter had a half-sister, Voleta Alice Moque.

Snelling studied at George Washington University, receiving a B.S. in 1904, and at Harvard University, where he received a second B.S. in 1905. He then attended Yale University and received a Ph.D. from George Washington University in 1907.

From 1907 to 1910, he worked for the U.S. Geological Survey, initially in Washington, D.C. and later in Pittsburgh. He invented an underwater detonator that was credited with saving the U.S. government $500,000 a year during the construction of the Panama Canal.

Development of propane as a significant fuel
In 1910, Snelling became chemist-in-charge of the explosives laboratory at the U.S. Bureau of Mines. A  major focus of his job was mine safety, but he also researched the production of propane, which had been discovered dissolved in Pennsylvanian light crude oil by Edmund Ronalds in 1864. Snelling highlighted it as a volatile component in gasoline in 1910, built a distilling apparatus and separated "wild gasoline" into liquid and gaseous components.  The volatility of these lighter hydrocarbons caused them to be known as "wild" because of the high vapor pressures of unrefined gasoline.  On March 31, the New York Times reported on Dr. Snelling's work with liquefied gas and that "...a steel bottle will carry enough gas to light an ordinary home for three weeks."

Snelling's work with "wild gas" became the basis for a patent critical to Snelling's next venture, development of a commercial method to produce liquefied petroleum gas (mostly propane).    By the end of 1911, Snelling had established contact with Frank P. Peterson,  Chester Kerr and Arthur Kerr, who were actively researching natural gas gasoline.  On  Nov.  11,  1911,  American  Gasol  Co.  was  incorporated in West Virginia. C.  L. Kerr, Frank Peterson and  Snelling each held 261 shares of the initial 2,000 shares  of  stock. Kerr was named  president, and Peterson and Snelling were among the directors of the new company.  On March 25, 1913, Snelling's method of processing and producing LP gases was issued patent #1,056,845. A separate method of producing LP gas through compression was created by Frank Peterson and its patent granted on July 2, 1912.

The first customer for liquified  petroleum  gas was John  Gahring, who had it installed for lighting and cooking in his home as of May 17, 1912.  By June 1912, Snelling felt that the business was stable enough to enable him to resign from the Bureau of Mines. However, expansion was slow, and in September 1912, M.  L.  Benedum  and  J.  C.  Trees of  Pittsburgh financed the company, paying  $10,000  for  200  shares  of  stock  each. On August 25, 1913, E. W. De Bower offered Snelling, Peterson and Kerr a certified check for $50,000 for American  Gasol, and gave them 30 minutes to decide whether or not to sell.  Peterson and Kerr voted to accept the offer, and Snelling reluctantly agreed.

Analysis of sample of propane that can be traced back to Dr. Snelling has been shown to contain 0.062 mole% methane, 23.44 mole% ethane, 57.366 mole% propane, 7.127 mole% isobutane, 11.957 mole% butane and 0.044 mole% isopentane. In 1913, Snelling sold his propane patent for $50,000 to Frank Phillips, the founder of Phillips Petroleum.

Snelling worked as a consultant and private researcher until 1917 when he was offered full-time employment at the Trojan Powder Company. He eventually became Director of Research. Snelling remained with Trojan from 1917 until his retirement in 1954, and continued to consult for them until 1957.

During World War II, Snelling did considerable work on military ordnance, including service at Plum Brook Ordnance Works, Sandusky, Ohio and the Supreme Headquarters Allied Expeditionary Force in Germany. While at Plum Brook, he studied the effects of sunlight on TNT, and discovered that TNT could be used instead of silver salts to coat photographic paper.

In 1946 he became a consultant to the newly formed Atomic Energy Commission, serving as a member of the Raw Materials Advisory Committee until 1960 when it was dissolved. By 1960, he held 179 patents, most in the areas of propane, oil-cracking, explosives and ordnance.

His work was recognized by the Franklin Institute through the Edward Longstreth Medal in 1962. He was awarded an honorary doctor of science from Lehigh University.

Personal life
In 1919, Snelling married Helen Marjorie Gahring (1901–1976) in Union City, Pennsylvania. She was the daughter of his first customer, John Gahring. The Snellings had seven children and lived their entire married lives in Allentown, Pennsylvania. The family purchased a home at the edge of the city's West Park in either 1940 or 1941, and Walter remained there until his death on September 10, 1965.

One of their sons, Richard Arkwright Snelling, was the Governor of Vermont. Another son, Charles Darwin Snelling, was appointed chairman of the Metropolitan Washington Airports Authority, a life trustee of Cedar Crest College in Allentown, a member of the Propane Education and Research Council, and past president of the Pennsylvania Society. He published a short memoir in New York Times columnist David Brooks' blog.

In popular culture
On the animated television series King of the Hill, Hank Hill refers to Snelling as the "father of modern propane."

References

External links

 
 

1880 births
1965 deaths
20th-century American chemists
20th-century American inventors
Scientists from Allentown, Pennsylvania
People from Washington, D.C.
Harvard University alumni
Yale University alumni
George Washington University alumni
Snelling family